Austrocenangium is a genus of fungi in the family Cordieritidaceae. It contains two species.

References

Leotiomycetes
Leotiomycetes genera
Taxa described in 1997